The Taipei Metro Zhongyi station (formerly transliterated as Chungyi Station until 2003) is located in Beitou District, Taipei. Taiwan. It is a station on the Tamsui–Xinyi Line. In the past, the station belonged to the now-defunct TRA Tamsui Line.

Station overview

The at-grade, station structure with two side platforms and a single exit. It is located on the south of Zhongyang North Road. The washrooms are inside the entrance area.

History
This station was built on 1 November 1961; and was replaced by the request station on 1 July 1979. It was closed from 15 July 1988 to 28 March 1997.

Station layout

Around the station
 Taipei City University of Science and Technology

References

Tamsui–Xinyi line stations
Railway stations opened in 1961
Railway stations closed in 1988
Railway stations opened in 1997